Jermauria Rasco (born October 5, 1992) is an American football linebacker who is currently a free agent. He was signed by the Green Bay Packers as an undrafted free agent in 2015 after not being selected in that year's NFL Draft. He played college football at LSU.

Early life 

Rasco grew up in Shreveport, Louisiana. For high school he attended Evangel Christian Academy, and played on their football team. During his senior year in 2010, Rasco was a highly ranked high school prospect for colleges. Rivals.com ranked him as the eighth best defensive end recruit nationally, the ninth best prospect in the state of Louisiana, and the 168th ranked player nationally.

College career 

After high school, Rasco committed to play college football for the LSU Tigers. He played at LSU from 2011 through 2014, playing all four years in 48 games, with 26 starts. Rasco finished his college career with 154 career tackles, with the most coming his senior season, with 71 tackles in 2014.

Professional career

Green Bay Packers 
On May 8, 2015, Rasco signed with the Green Bay Packers. On September 5, 2015, Rasco was waived/injured. He was placed on injured reserve until he was released on December 29, 2015.

Tampa Bay Buccaneers
On February 5, 2016, Rasco was signed to a futures contract by the Tampa Bay Buccaneers. On April 29, 2016, he was waived.

Pittsburgh Steelers 
On August 15, 2016, Rasco signed with the Pittsburgh Steelers. On September 3, 2016, he was released by the Steelers as part of final roster cuts.

Coaching career

University of Arizona 
In March of 2019, Rasco joined the University of Arizona Football coaching staff under coach Kevin Sumlin as the team's Defensive Analyst.

References

External links
Tampa Bay Buccaneers bio

1992 births
Living people
American football defensive ends
Tampa Bay Buccaneers players
Players of American football from Shreveport, Louisiana
Green Bay Packers players
Pittsburgh Steelers players